Manuel Agromayor Santiago (21 March 1900 – ) was an Argentine screenwriter and journalist from Buenos Aires.  At the 1944 Argentine Film Critics Association Awards he won the Silver Condor Award for Best Adapted Screenplay with Pedro E. Pico and Alfredo de la Guardia for Juvenilia. He also wrote the script with de la Guardia for Inspiración (1945) and Allá en el setenta y tantos (1946).

Selected filmography
 Back in the Seventies (1945)

References

External links
 

Argentine screenwriters
Male screenwriters
Argentine male writers
1900 births
Year of death missing